Joe Mackin was a Scottish professional footballer who played as a goalkeeper for Muirkirk Juniors, Kettering Town, Dunfermline Athletic, Ayr United, Motherwell and Carlisle United.

References

Date of birth missing
Date of death missing
Scottish footballers
Muirkirk Juniors F.C. players
Kettering Town F.C. players
Dunfermline Athletic F.C. players
Ayr United F.C. players
Motherwell F.C. players
Carlisle United F.C. players
Scottish Football League players
Association football goalkeepers